Guvera was an online music and entertainment streaming service founded in 2008. Guvera had agreements with the music labels in the regions where the product was available, which allowed for legal free music streams. As of May 2017, Guvera has shut down all operations across all remaining Asian markets.

Music streaming
Guvera streamed music and entertainment for its users and held licensing agreements with Universal Music Group, EMI, Orchard, INgrooves, IODA, Mushroom/Liberation, Shock Records, Believe Digital; in addition to the rights bodies APRA, AMCOS, BMI, RightsFlow, Acodem, SESAC, Cash, Emmasacm, Extraphone, Peer, Prs/Impel, Filscap, First Music Publishing, Latinautor, Macp, Megaliner, National Music Publishing, Sabam, Sadaic, Sba, Sacem, Siae, Socan, Sonyatv, Sesac, Sgae, Solar, Warner Chappell, Universal Music Publishing, and Unisys. Guvera distributed DRM-free MP3 downloads with bitrates of 256 and 320 kbit/s. Guvera was also a targeted advertising platform, which targeted ads at relevant music genres. Content could be streamed via brand channels from within Guvera's platform, and the advertisers had a role in the selecting music content.

Guvera was available on web browsers, iOS, Android and the Windows Phone.

History
Guvera was initially funded by AMMA Private Investment out of Australia. Guvera raised about $50m from its base of about 1000 smaller sophisticated investors primarily made up of accounting firms and other financial services businesses.
Guvera was incorporated in 2008, and launched beta in Australia February 2010, and in the US March, 2010. Guvera was initially released as a beta to a select group of users by invitation only.

On August 2011, Guvera appointed Phil Quartararo as its Global Head of Music. In September 2011 Guvera moved into new headquarters in The Rocket in Robina, Gold Coast, Australia. In March 2012, Guvera created a mobile platform and in December 2012, Guvera released mobile apps for IOS and Android in Australia. An iPad app was then released in August 2013. In March 2014, Guvera signed an agreement with Lenovo to become its worldwide music partner, with Guvera's music streaming service pre-installed onto Lenovo mobile devices.

In January 2015 Guvera acquired Blinkbox Music from Tesco. It placed the company into administration in June 2015, having exhausted Blinkbox's financial reserves. The company had bought Blinkbox Music as part of an agreement with Tesco that it would pay its employees a higher rate of redundancy payment if the business failed, which it did not honour. In 2015 the company received a Gold award at Asia App Design Awards.

In October 2015 the former employees of Blinkbox Music filed a £10m Employment Tribunal case against Guvera. The Tribunal awarded them £3.5m in damages, which Guvera appealed. The Employment Appeal Tribunal dismissed the appeal in November 2017.

In May 2016 Guvera won an international Gold at the Global App Design Awards.

In June 2016 Guvera was blocked from a stockmarket listing.

Guvera began operating in only 5 markets: Australia, India, Indonesia, Saudi Arabia, and the United Arab Emirates and in July 2016, Darren Herft stepped down as CEO and founder Claes Loberg stepped into the position.

On 27 July 2016, the company shut down its operations in its home market of Australia and reiterated its intentions to "focus all efforts in key emerging countries, such as India and Indonesia".

On 27 June 2017 it was reported that a federal investigation in to Guvera had started.

On 22 November 2017 it was reported that Guvera had lost their appeal against an earlier ruling, which found in favour of the former employees of Blinkbox Music.

In January 2018, former CEO Darren Herft was questioned in a public hearing by the Federal Court of Sydney about the company's operation and failure.

See also
 Streaming media
 List of online music databases

References

External links

Download websites
Companies based on the Gold Coast, Queensland
Australian companies established in 2008
Entertainment companies established in 2008
Australian streaming companies
2008 software
Android (operating system) software
IOS software
Jukebox-style media players
Online music database clients
Software that uses Qt
Music streaming services
Symbian software
Australian music websites
Internet properties established in 2008
2017 disestablishments in Australia
Entertainment companies disestablished in 2017
Internet properties disestablished in 2017